The 1989 NCAA Division I Wrestling Championships were the 59th NCAA Division I Wrestling Championships to be held. Both University of Oklahoma in Norman, Oklahoma and Oklahoma State University in Stillwater, Oklahoma hosted the tournament at McCasland Field House and Gallagher-Iba Arena, respectively.

Oklahoma State won the team championship with 91.25 points, their 28th team title, and had two individual champions. 

Tim Krieger of Iowa State was named the Most Outstanding Wrestler and Mike Cole of Clarion received the Gorriaran Award.

Team results

Individual finals

References
1989 NCAA Tournament Results

NCAA Division I Wrestling Championship
NCAA
Wrestling competitions in the United States
NCAA Division I  Wrestling Championships
NCAA Division I  Wrestling Championships
NCAA Division I  Wrestling Championships